The 2023 All-Ireland Senior Hurling Championship is due to be the 136th staging of the All-Ireland Senior Hurling Championship, the Gaelic Athletic Association's premier inter-county hurling tournament, since its establishment in 1887. The championship is planned to begin in April 2023 and end in July 2023.

Limerick enter the championship as defending champions having won the previous three championships.

Teams

Personnel and general information

Summary

Championships

Leinster Senior Hurling Championship

Leinster table

{| class="wikitable" style="text-align:center"
!width=20|
!width=150 style="text-align:left;"|Team
!width=20|
!width=20|
!width=20|
!width=20|
!width=40|
!width=40|
!width=20|
!width=20|
!Qualification
|- style="background:#ccffcc"
|1
| style="text-align:left" |  Dublin
|
|
|
|
|
|
|
|
| rowspan="2" |Advance to Leinster Final
|- style="background:#ccffcc"
|2
| style="text-align:left" |  Galway
|
|
|
|
|
|
|
|
|- style="background:#FFFFE0"
|3
| style="text-align:left" |  Kilkenny
|
|
|
|
|
|
|
|
|Advance to Preliminary Quarter-Finals
|-
|4
| style="text-align:left" |  Wexford
|
|
|
|
|
|
|
|
| rowspan="2" |
|-
|5
| style="text-align:left" |  Westmeath
|
|
|
|
|
|
|
|
|- style="background:#ffcccc" 
|6
| style="text-align:left" |  Antrim
|
|
|
|
|
|
|
|
|Possible Relegation
|}

Munster Senior Hurling Championship

Munster table

{| class="wikitable" style="text-align:center"
!width=20|
!width=150 style="text-align:left;"|Team
!width=20|
!width=20|
!width=20|
!width=20|
!width=40|
!width=40|
!width=20|
!width=20|
!Qualification
|- style="background:#ccffcc"
|1
| style="text-align:left" |  Clare
|
|
|
|
|
|
|
|
| rowspan="2" |Advance to Munster Final
|- style="background:#ccffcc"
|2
| style="text-align:left" |  Limerick
|
|
|
|
|
|
|
|
|- style="background:#FFFFE0"
|3
| style="text-align:left" |  Cork
|
|
|
|
|
|
|
|
|Advance to Preliminary Quarter-Finals
|-
|4
| style="text-align:left" |  Waterford
|
|
|
|
|
|
|
|
|
|- style="background:#ffcccc" 
|5
| style="text-align:left" |  Tipperary
|
|
|
|
|
|
|
|
|Possible Relegation
|}

Joe McDonagh Cup

Table
{| class="wikitable" style="text-align:center"
!width=20|
!width=150 style="text-align:left;"|Team
!width=20|
!width=20|
!width=20|
!width=20|
!width=40|
!width=40|
!width=20|
!width=20|
!Qualification
|- style="background:#ccffcc"
|1
| style="text-align:left" |  Carlow
| 0
| 0
| 0
| 0
| 0
| 0
| 0
| 0
| rowspan="2" |Advance to Knockout Stage and All-Ireland Preliminary Quarter-Finals
|- style="background:#ccffcc"
|2
| style="text-align:left" |  Down
| 0
| 0
| 0
| 0
| 0
| 0
| 0
| 0
|-
|3
| style="text-align:left" | Kildare
| 0
| 0
| 0
| 0
| 0
| 0
| 0
| 0
| rowspan="3" |
|-
|4
| style="text-align:left" |  Laois
| 0
| 0
| 0
| 0
| 0
| 0
| 0
| 0
|-
|5
|  style="text-align:left" | Offaly
| 0
| 0
| 0
| 0
| 0
| 0
| 0
| 0
|- style="background:#ffcccc" 
|6
|  style="text-align:left" | Kerry
| 0
| 0
| 0
| 0
| 0
| 0
| 0
| 0
|Relegated to Christy Ring Cup
|}

All-Ireland Senior Hurling Championship

Bracket

All-Ireland preliminary quarter-finals

All-Ireland quarter-finals

All-Ireland semi-finals

All-Ireland final

References

All-Ireland Senior Hurling Championship
All-Ireland Senior Hurling Championship